Crimson Lotus is a progressive metal band from Finland. Founded in 1997 as a cover band, the band was disrupted by its members' military service in 2002 to be revived in summer 2003 by Pekka Aalto and Pasi Kainiemi. They make up the core of the current line-up; other contributors are generally considered guest musicians.

On January 1, 2004, Crimson Lotus released their first EP, "Foreword", with guest vocalists Megan Branigan, Susanna Syrjä and Landis Lee Bender II. The release was greeted with very positive reviews after being circulated on the Internet.

The musical and conceptual continuation of "Foreword", "Sinful Deeds" was released on September 5, 2005. Susanna Syrjä and Landis Lee Bender performed vocals again, joined by Matti Auerkallio. Hannu Leppänen (guitar) and Laura Hagström (piano) also performed on the second EP.

The third release, "Bloodstained Heroes", followed on December 23, 2006. This time the vocals were performed by Matti Auerkallio, and the EP was mastered by Pirkka Rännäli.

Line-up 
 Pasi Kainiemi - composing, mixing, mastering, guitars, synth programming & sequencing, vocal arrangements, lyrics
 Pekka Aalto - lyrics, drums, vocal arrangements, composing, mixing, booklet layout

Guest talent 
 Megan Branigan - Vocals on Foreword
 Susanna Syrjä - Vocals on Foreword and Sinful Deeds
 Landis Lee Bender II - Vocals on Foreword and Sinful Deeds
 Matti Auerkallio - Vocals on Sinful Deeds and Bloodstained Heroes
 Hannu Leppänen - Guitar on Sinful Deeds
 Laura Hagström - Piano on Sinful Deeds

Discography 
 Foreword (2004)
 Sinful Deeds (2005)
 Bloodstained Heroes (2006)

External links 
 Official Crimson Lotus website (including both releases as free downloads)
 Crimson Lotus on last.fm
 

Finnish progressive metal musical groups
Musical groups established in 1997